Rabsztyn Castle is a preserved Gothic ruined castle located in the Polish Jura within the Eagles' Nests Trail, in the village of Rabsztyn, Lesser Poland Voivodeship in southern Poland.

The etymology of Rabsztyn Castle derives from the German Rabenstein, translating to Raven's Rock. 

Having undergone extensive reconstruction, since May 2015, the castle has been opened to tourists.

See also
 Castles in Poland

References

External links 

Castles in Lesser Poland Voivodeship